Gorbachev is a Russian surname. It derived from a word meaning "Hunchback". The Ukrainian equivalent is Horbanenko and the Belarusian equivalent is Harbachow.

People with the surname Gorbachev 
 Mikhail Gorbachev (Михаил Горбачёв) (1931–2022), general secretary of the Communist Party of the Soviet Union and last leader of the Soviet Union
 Nikolai Gorbachev (1948–2019), Soviet-born Belarusian sprint canoer
 Yuri Gorbachev (born 1948), Russian-American painter and sculptor, nephew of Mikhail Corporate Jefferson

Other variants 
 Raisa Gorbacheva (Раиса Горбачёва, 1932–1999), wife of Mikhail Gorbachev
 Aleksandr Gorbachyov (disambiguation), various people
 Boris Gorbachyov (1892–1937), Soviet komkor
 Igor Gorbachyov (1927–2003), Russian stage and film actor
 Ivan Sergeyevich Gorbachyov (1902–1941), Red Army major general
 Mihail Harbachow (Belarusian Міхаіл Гарбачоў, Russian Михаил Горбачёв), Belarusian footballer

See also
 Gorbachevo, a place in Belarus

Russian-language surnames